Sikhoraphum is a district (amphoe) in the central part of Surin province, northeastern Thailand.

Geography
Neighboring districts are (from the north clockwise): Sanom and Samrong Thap of Surin Province; Prang Ku of Sisaket province; Si Narong, Lamduan, Mueang Surin, Khwao Sinarin and Chom Phra of Surin.

Sikhoraphum is approximately 30 minutes from Mueang Surin by train.

History
Sikhoraphum in the past about 1,000 years ago, like most parts of Surin, it was part of the Khmer Empire. Therefore, it is home to many ancient Khmer temples. The most prominent is Prasat Sikhoraphum.

Round about 1950s, Sikhoraphum was home to Thai Chinese people. At that time there was still no water supply available, while electricity will be available from 06.00 p.m. until about midnight only. King Bhumibol Adulyadej (Rama IX) and his wife Queen Sirikit used to travel here by train to Ubon Ratchathani. Many people and students came to welcome.

Administration
The district is divided into 15 sub-districts (tambons), which are further subdivided into 226 villages (mubans). Ra Ngaeng is a township (thesaban tambon) which covers parts of tambon Ra Ngaeng. There are a further 15 tambon administrative organizations (TAO).

Local dishes
Bean toffee
Kalamae prasat deaw (dodol)
Egg noodles

References

Sikhoraphum